Estádio D. Afonso Henriques was a multi-use stadium in Guimarães, Portugal. It was initially used as the stadium of Vitória S.C. matches.  It was replaced by the current Estádio D. Afonso Henriques in 2004.  The capacity of the stadium was 33,000 spectators.

Portugal national football team

The following national team matches were held in the stadium.

External links
 Stadium information

D. Afonso Henriques
Sports venues completed in 1965